Fairfield is a census-designated place and unincorporated community in Sumner County, Tennessee, United States. Its population was 131 as of the 2010 census.

References

Census-designated places in Sumner County, Tennessee
Census-designated places in Tennessee
Unincorporated communities in Tennessee